Mysticism is popularly known as becoming one with God or the Absolute, but may refer to any kind of ecstasy or altered state of consciousness which is given a religious or spiritual meaning. It may also refer to the attainment of insight in ultimate or hidden truths, and to human transformation supported by various practices and experiences.

The term "mysticism" has Ancient Greek origins with various historically determined meanings. Derived from the Greek word μύω múō, meaning "to close" or "to conceal", mysticism referred to the biblical, liturgical, spiritual, and contemplative dimensions of early and medieval Christianity. During the early modern period, the definition of mysticism grew to include a broad range of beliefs and ideologies related to "extraordinary experiences and states of mind."

In modern times, "mysticism" has acquired a limited definition, with broad applications, as meaning the aim at the "union with the Absolute, the Infinite, or God". This limited definition has been applied to a wide range of religious traditions and practices, valuing "mystical experience" as a key element of mysticism.

Since the 1960s scholars have debated the merits of perennial and constructionist approaches in the scientific research of "mystical experiences". The perennial position is now "largely dismissed by scholars", most scholars using a contextualist approach, which considers the cultural and historical context.

Etymology 

"Mysticism" is derived from the Greek , meaning "I conceal", and its derivative , mystikos, meaning 'an initiate'. The verb  has received a quite different meaning in the Greek language, where it is still in use. The primary meanings it has are "induct" and "initiate". Secondary meanings include "introduce", "make someone aware of something", "train", "familiarize", "give first experience of something".

The related form of the verb  (mueó or myéō) appears in the New Testament. As explained in Strong's Concordance, it properly means shutting the eyes and mouth to experience mystery. Its figurative meaning is to be initiated into the "mystery revelation". The meaning derives from the initiatory rites of the pagan mysteries. Also appearing in the New Testament is the related noun  (mustérion or mystḗrion), the root word of the English term "mystery". The term means "anything hidden", a mystery or secret, of which initiation is necessary. In the New Testament it reportedly takes the meaning of the counsels of God, once hidden but now revealed in the Gospel or some fact thereof, the Christian revelation generally, and/or particular truths or details of the Christian revelation.

According to Thayer's Greek Lexicon, the term  in classical Greek meant "a hidden thing", "secret". A particular meaning it took in Classical antiquity was a religious secret or religious secrets, confided only to the initiated and not to be communicated by them to ordinary mortals. In the Septuagint and the New Testament the meaning it took was that of a hidden purpose or counsel, a secret will. It is sometimes used for the hidden wills of humans, but is more often used for the hidden will of God. Elsewhere in the Bible it takes the meaning of the mystic or hidden sense of things. It is used for the secrets behind sayings, names, or behind images seen in visions and dreams. The Vulgate often translates the Greek term to the Latin  (sacrament).

The related noun  (mustis or mystis, singular) means the initiate, the person initiated to the mysteries. According to Ana Jiménez San Cristobal in her study of Greco-Roman mysteries and Orphism, the singular form  and the plural form  are used in ancient Greek texts to mean the person or persons initiated to religious mysteries. These followers of mystery religions belonged to a select group, where access was only gained through an initiation. She finds that the terms were associated with the term  (Bacchus), which was used for a special class of initiates of the Orphic mysteries. The terms are first found connected in the writings of Heraclitus. Such initiates are identified in texts with the persons who have been purified and have performed certain rites. Such initiates were believers in the god Dionysus Bacchus who took on the name of their god and sought an identification with their deity.

Until the sixth century the practice of what is now called mysticism was referred to by the term contemplatio, c.q. theoria. According to Johnston, "[b]oth contemplation and mysticism speak of the eye of love which is looking at, gazing at, aware of divine realities."

Definitions 
According to Peter Moore, the term "mysticism" is "problematic but indispensable." It is a generic term which joins together into one concept separate practices and ideas which developed separately, According to Dupré, "mysticism" has been defined in many ways, and Merkur notes that the definition, or meaning, of the term "mysticism" has changed through the ages. Moore further notes that the term "mysticism" has become a popular label for "anything nebulous, esoteric, occult, or supernatural."

Parsons warns that "what might at times seem to be a straightforward phenomenon exhibiting an unambiguous commonality has become, at least within the academic study of religion, opaque and controversial on multiple levels". Because of its Christian overtones, and the lack of similar terms in other cultures, some scholars regard the term "mysticism" to be inadequate as a useful descriptive term. Other scholars regard the term to be an inauthentic fabrication, the "product of post-Enlightenment universalism."

Union with the Divine or Absolute and mystical experience 

Deriving from Neo-Platonism and Henosis, mysticism is popularly known as union with God or the Absolute. In the 13th century the term unio mystica came to be used to refer to the "spiritual marriage," the ecstasy, or rapture, that was experienced when prayer was used "to contemplate both God’s omnipresence in the world and God in his essence." In the 19th century, under the influence of Romanticism, this "union" was interpreted as a "religious experience," which provides certainty about God or a transcendental reality.

An influential proponent of this understanding was William James (1842–1910), who stated that "in mystic states we both become one with the Absolute and we become aware of our oneness." William James popularized this use of the term "religious experience" in his The Varieties of Religious Experience, contributing to the interpretation of mysticism as a distinctive experience, comparable to sensory experiences. Religious experiences belonged to the "personal religion," which he considered to be "more fundamental than either theology or ecclesiasticism". He gave a Perennialist interpretation to religious experience, stating that this kind of experience is ultimately uniform in various traditions.

McGinn notes that the term unio mystica, although it has Christian origins, is primarily a modern expression. McGinn argues that "presence" is more accurate than "union", since not all mystics spoke of union with God, and since many visions and miracles were not necessarily related to union. He also argues that we should speak of "consciousness" of God's presence, rather than of "experience", since mystical activity is not simply about the sensation of God as an external object, but more broadly about "new ways of knowing and loving based on states of awareness in which God becomes present in our inner acts."

However, the idea of "union" does not work in all contexts. For example, in Advaita Vedanta, there is only one reality (Brahman) and therefore nothing other than reality to unite with it—Brahman in each person (atman) has always in fact been identical to Brahman all along. Dan Merkur also notes that union with God or the Absolute is a too limited definition, since there are also traditions which aim not at a sense of unity, but of nothingness, such as Pseudo-Dionysius the Areopagite and Meister Eckhart. According to Merkur, Kabbala and Buddhism also emphasize nothingness. Blakemore and Jennett note that "definitions of mysticism [...] are often imprecise." They further note that this kind of interpretation and definition is a recent development which has become the standard definition and understanding.

According to Gelman, "A unitive experience involves a phenomenological de-emphasis, blurring, or eradication of multiplicity, where the cognitive significance of the experience is deemed to lie precisely in that phenomenological feature".

Religious ecstasies and interpretative context 

Mysticism involves an explanatory context, which provides meaning for mystical and visionary experiences, and related experiences like trances. According to Dan Merkur, mysticism may relate to any kind of ecstasy or altered state of consciousness, and the ideas and explanations related to them. Parsons stresses the importance of distinguishing between temporary experiences and mysticism as a process, which is embodied within a "religious matrix" of texts and practices. Richard Jones does the same. Peter Moore notes that mystical experience may also happen in a spontaneous and natural way, to people who are not committed to any religious tradition. These experiences are not necessarily interpreted in a religious framework. Ann Taves asks by which processes experiences are set apart and deemed religious or mystical.

Intuitive insight and enlightenment 

Some authors emphasize that mystical experience involves intuitive understanding of the meaning of existence and of hidden truths, and the resolution of life problems. According to Larson, "mystical experience is an intuitive understanding and realization of the meaning of existence." According to McClenon, mysticism is "the doctrine that special mental states or events allow an understanding of ultimate truths." According to James R. Horne, mystical illumination is "a central visionary experience [...] that results in the resolution of a personal or religious problem.

According to Evelyn Underhill, illumination is a generic English term for the phenomenon of mysticism. The term illumination is derived from the Latin illuminatio, applied to Christian prayer in the 15th century. Comparable Asian terms are bodhi, kensho and satori in Buddhism, commonly translated as "enlightenment", and vipassana, which all point to cognitive processes of intuition and comprehension. According to Wright, the use of the western word enlightenment is based on the supposed resemblance of bodhi with Aufklärung, the independent use of reason to gain insight into the true nature of our world, and there are more resemblances with Romanticism than with the Enlightenment: the emphasis on feeling, on intuitive insight, on a true essence beyond the world of appearances.

Spiritual life and re-formation 

Other authors point out that mysticism involves more than "mystical experience." According to Gellmann, the ultimate goal of mysticism is human transformation, not just experiencing mystical or visionary states. According to McGinn, personal transformation is the essential criterion to determine the authenticity of Christian mysticism.

History of the term

Hellenistic world 
In the Hellenistic world, 'mystical' referred to "secret" religious rituals like the Eleusinian Mysteries. The use of the word lacked any direct references to the transcendental. A "mystikos" was an initiate of a mystery religion.

Early Christianity - theoria (contemplation)

In early Christianity the term "mystikos" referred to three dimensions, which soon became intertwined, namely the biblical, the liturgical and the spiritual or contemplative. The biblical dimension refers to "hidden" or allegorical interpretations of Scriptures. The liturgical dimension refers to the liturgical mystery of the Eucharist, the presence of Christ in the Eucharist. The third dimension is the contemplative or experiential knowledge of God.

Until the sixth century, the Greek term theoria, meaning "contemplation" in Latin, was used for the mystical interpretation of the Bible. and the vision of God. The link between mysticism and the vision of the Divine was introduced by the early Church Fathers, who used the term as an adjective, as in mystical theology and mystical contemplation. 

Theoria enabled the Fathers to perceive depths of meaning in the biblical writings that escape a purely scientific or empirical approach to interpretation. The Antiochene Fathers, in particular, saw in every passage of Scripture a double meaning, both literal and spiritual.

Later, theoria or contemplation came to be distinguished from intellectual life, leading to the identification of θεωρία or contemplatio with a form of prayer distinguished from discursive meditation in both East and West.

Medieval meaning 

This threefold meaning of "mystical" continued in the Middle Ages. According to Dan Merkur, the term unio mystica came into use in the 13th century as a synonym for the "spiritual marriage," the ecstasy, or rapture, that was experienced when prayer was used "to contemplate both God’s omnipresence in the world and God in his essence." Under the influence of Pseudo-Dionysius the Areopagite the mystical theology came to denote the investigation of the allegorical truth of the Bible, and "the spiritual awareness of the ineffable Absolute beyond the theology of divine names." Pseudo-Dionysius' Apophatic theology, or "negative theology", exerted a great influence on medieval monastic religiosity, although it was mostly a male religiosity, since women were not allowed to study. It was influenced by Neo-Platonism, and very influential in Eastern Orthodox Christian theology. In western Christianity it was a counter-current to the prevailing Cataphatic theology or "positive theology". Mysticism was also manifested in various sects of the time such as the Waldensians.

Early modern meaning 

In the sixteenth and seventeenth century mysticism came to be used as a substantive. This shift was linked to a new discourse, in which science and religion were separated.

Luther dismissed the allegorical interpretation of the bible, and condemned Mystical theology, which he saw as more Platonic than Christian. "The mystical", as the search for the hidden meaning of texts, became secularised, and also associated with literature, as opposed to science and prose.

Science was also distinguished from religion. By the middle of the 17th century, "the mystical" is increasingly applied exclusively to the religious realm, separating religion and "natural philosophy" as two distinct approaches to the discovery of the hidden meaning of the universe. The traditional hagiographies and writings of the saints became designated as "mystical", shifting from the virtues and miracles to extraordinary experiences and states of mind, thereby creating a newly coined "mystical tradition". A new understanding developed of the Divine as residing within human, an essence beyond the varieties of religious expressions.

Contemporary meaning 

The 19th century saw a growing emphasis on individual experience, as a defense against the growing rationalism of western society. The meaning of mysticism was considerably narrowed:

Under the influence of Perennialism, which was popularised in both the west and the east by Unitarianism, Transcendentalists and Theosophy, mysticism has been applied to a broad spectrum of religious traditions, in which all sorts of esotericism and religious traditions and practices are joined together. The term mysticism was extended to comparable phenomena in non-Christian religions, where it influenced Hindu and Buddhist responses to colonialism, resulting in Neo-Vedanta and Buddhist modernism.

In the contemporary usage "mysticism" has become an umbrella term for all sorts of non-rational world views, parapsychology and pseudoscience. William Harmless even states that mysticism has become "a catch-all for religious weirdness". Within the academic study of religion the apparent "unambiguous commonality" has become "opaque and controversial". The term "mysticism" is being used in different ways in different traditions. Some call to attention the conflation of mysticism and linked terms, such as spirituality and esotericism, and point at the differences between various traditions.

Variations of mysticism 
Based on various definitions of mysticism, namely mysticism as an experience of union or nothingness, mysticism as any kind of an altered state of consciousness which is attributed in a religious way, mysticism as "enlightenment" or insight, and mysticism as a way of transformation, "mysticism" can be found in many cultures and religious traditions, both in folk religion and organized religion. These traditions include practices to induce religious or mystical experiences, but also ethical standards and practices to enhance self-control and integrate the mystical experience into daily life.

Dan Merkur notes, though, that mystical practices are often separated from daily religious practices, and restricted to "religious specialists like monastics, priests, and other renunciates.

Shamanism 

According to Dan Merkur, shamanism may be regarded as a form of mysticism, in which the world of spirits is accessed through religious ecstasy. According to Mircea Eliade shamanism is a "technique of religious ecstasy."

Shamanism involves a practitioner reaching an altered state of consciousness in order to perceive and interact with spirits, and channel transcendental energies into this world. A shaman is a person regarded as having access to, and influence in, the world of benevolent and malevolent spirits, who typically enters into trance during a ritual, and practices divination and healing.

Neoshamanism refers to "new"' forms of shamanism, or methods of seeking visions or healing, typically practiced in Western countries. Neoshamanism comprises an eclectic range of beliefs and practices that involve attempts to attain altered states and communicate with a spirit world, and is associated with New Age practices.

Western mysticism

Mystery religions 

The Eleusinian Mysteries, (Greek: Ἐλευσίνια Μυστήρια) were annual initiation ceremonies in the cults of the goddesses Demeter and Persephone, held in secret at Eleusis (near Athens) in ancient Greece. The mysteries began in about 1600 B.C. in the Mycenean period and continued for two thousand years, becoming a major festival during the Hellenic era, and later spreading to Rome. Numerous scholars have proposed that the power of the Eleusinian Mysteries came from the kykeon's functioning as an entheogen.

Christian mysticism

Early Christianity 
The apophatic theology, or "negative theology", of Pseudo-Dionysius the Areopagite (6th c.) exerted a great influence on medieval monastic religiosity, both in the East and (by Latin translation) in the West. Pseudo-Dionysius applied Neoplatonic thought, particularly that of Proclus, to Christian theology.

Eastern Orthodox Christianity 
The Eastern Orthodox Church has a long tradition of theoria (intimate experience) and hesychia (inner stillness), in which contemplative prayer silences the mind to progress along the path of theosis (deification).

Theosis, practical unity with and conformity to God, is obtained by engaging in contemplative prayer, the first stage of theoria, which results from the cultivation of watchfulness (nepsis). In theoria, one comes to behold the "divisibly indivisible" divine operations (energeia) of God as the "uncreated light" of transfiguration, a grace which is eternal and proceeds naturally from the blinding darkness of the incomprehensible divine essence. It is the main aim of hesychasm, which was developed in the thought St. Symeon the New Theologian, embraced by the monastic communities on Mount Athos, and most notably defended by St. Gregory Palamas against the Greek humanist philosopher Barlaam of Calabria. According to Roman Catholic critics, hesychastic practice has its roots to the introduction of a systematic practical approach to quietism by Symeon the New Theologian.

Symeon believed that direct experience gave monks the authority to preach and give absolution of sins, without the need for formal ordination. While Church authorities also taught from a speculative and philosophical perspective, Symeon taught from his own direct mystical experience, and met with strong resistance for his charismatic approach, and his support of individual direct experience of God's grace.

Western Europe 

The High Middle Ages saw a flourishing of mystical practice and theorization in western Roman Catholicism, corresponding to the flourishing of new monastic orders, with such figures as Guigo II, Hildegard of Bingen, Bernard of Clairvaux, the Victorines, all coming from different orders, as well as the first real flowering of popular piety among the laypeople.

The Late Middle Ages saw the clash between the Dominican and Franciscan schools of thought, which was also a conflict between two different mystical theologies: on the one hand that of Dominic de Guzmán and on the other that of Francis of Assisi, Anthony of Padua, Bonaventure, and Angela of Foligno. This period also saw such individuals as John of Ruysbroeck, Catherine of Siena and Catherine of Genoa, the Devotio Moderna, and such books as the Theologia Germanica, The Cloud of Unknowing and The Imitation of Christ.

Moreover, there was the growth of groups of mystics centered around geographic regions: the Beguines, such as Mechthild of Magdeburg and Hadewijch (among others); the Rhineland mystics Meister Eckhart, Johannes Tauler and Henry Suso; and the English mystics Richard Rolle, Walter Hilton and Julian of Norwich. The Spanish mystics included Teresa of Avila, John of the Cross and Ignatius Loyola.

The later post-reformation period also saw the writings of lay visionaries such as Emanuel Swedenborg and William Blake, and the foundation of mystical movements such as the Quakers. Catholic mysticism continued into the modern period with such figures as Padre Pio and Thomas Merton.

The philokalia, an ancient method of Eastern Orthodox mysticism, was promoted by the twentieth century Traditionalist School.

Western esotericism and modern spirituality 

Many western esoteric traditions and elements of modern spirituality have been regarded as "mysticism," such as Gnosticism, Transcendentalism, Theosophy, the Fourth Way, Martinus´ spiritual science, and Neo-Paganism. Modern western spiritually and transpersonal psychology combine western psycho-therapeutic practices with religious practices like meditation to attain a lasting transformation. Nature mysticism is an intense experience of unification with nature or the cosmic totality, which was popular with Romantic writers.

Jewish mysticism 

In the common era, Judaism has had two main kinds of mysticism: Merkabah mysticism and Kabbalah. The former predated the latter, and was focused on visions, particularly those mentioned in the Book of Ezekiel. It gets its name from the Hebrew word meaning "chariot", a reference to Ezekiel's vision of a fiery chariot composed of heavenly beings.

Kabbalah is a set of esoteric teachings meant to explain the relationship between an unchanging, eternal and mysterious Ein Sof (no end) and the mortal and finite universe (his creation). Inside Judaism, it forms the foundations of mystical religious interpretation.

Kabbalah originally developed entirely within the realm of Jewish thought. Kabbalists often use classical Jewish sources to explain and demonstrate its esoteric teachings. These teachings are thus held by followers in Judaism to define the inner meaning of both the Hebrew Bible and traditional Rabbinic literature, their formerly concealed transmitted dimension, as well as to explain the significance of Jewish religious observances.

Kabbalah emerged, after earlier forms of Jewish mysticism, in 12th to 13th century Southern France and Spain, becoming reinterpreted in the Jewish mystical renaissance of 16th-century Ottoman Palestine. It was popularised in the form of Hasidic Judaism from the 18th century forward. 20th-century interest in Kabbalah has inspired cross-denominational Jewish renewal and contributed to wider non-Jewish contemporary spirituality, as well as engaging its flourishing emergence and historical re-emphasis through newly established academic investigation.

Islamic mysticism 

The consensus is that Islam's inner and mystical dimension is encapsulated in Sufism.

Classical Sufi scholars have defined Sufism as

The origin of the word "Sufi" is ambiguous. One understanding is that Sufi means wool-wearer; wool wearers during early Islam were pious ascetics who withdrew from urban life. Another explanation of the word "Sufi" is that it means 'purity'.

Sufis generally belong to a halaqa, a circle or group, led by a Sheikh or Murshid. Sufi circles usually belong to a Tariqa which is the Sufi order and each has a Silsila, which is the spiritual lineage, which traces its succession back to notable Sufis of the past, and often ultimately to Muhammed or one of his close associates. The turuq (plural of tariqa) are not enclosed like Christian monastic orders; rather the members retain an outside life. Membership of a Sufi group often passes down family lines. Meetings may or may not be segregated according to the prevailing custom of the wider society. An existing Muslim faith is not always a requirement for entry, particularly in Western countries.

Sufi practice includes
 Dhikr, or remembrance (of God), which often takes the form of rhythmic chanting and breathing exercises.
 Sama, which takes the form of music and dance — the whirling dance of the Mevlevi dervishes is a form well known in the West.
 Muraqaba or meditation.
 Visiting holy places, particularly the tombs of Sufi saints, in order to remember death and the greatness of those who have passed.

The aims of Sufism include: the experience of ecstatic states (hal), purification of the heart (qalb), overcoming the lower self (nafs), extinction of the individual personality (fana), communion with God (haqiqa), and higher knowledge (marifat). Some sufic beliefs and practices have been found unorthodox by other Muslims; for instance Mansur al-Hallaj was put to death for blasphemy after uttering the phrase Ana'l Haqq, "I am the Truth" (i.e. God) in a trance.

Notable classical Sufis include Jalaluddin Rumi, Fariduddin Attar, Sultan Bahoo, Sayyed Sadique Ali Husaini, Saadi Shirazi and Hafez, all major poets in the Persian language. Omar Khayyam, Al-Ghazzali and Ibn Arabi were renowned scholars. Abdul Qadir Jilani, Moinuddin Chishti, and Bahauddin Naqshband founded major orders, as did Rumi. Rabia Basri was the most prominent female Sufi.

Sufism first came into contact with the Judeo-Christian world during the
Moorish occupation of Spain. An interest in Sufism revived in non-Muslim countries during the modern era, led by such figures as Inayat Khan and Idries Shah (both in the UK), Rene Guenon (France) and Ivan Aguéli (Sweden). Sufism has also long been present in Asian countries that do not have a Muslim majority, such as India and China.

Indic religions

Hinduism 

In Hinduism, various sadhanas (spiritual disciplines) aim at overcoming ignorance (avidya) and transcending one's identification with body, mind and ego to attain moksha, liberation from the cycle of birth and death. Hinduism has a number of interlinked ascetic traditions and philosophical schools which aim at moksha  and the acquisition of higher powers. With the onset of the British colonisation of India, those traditions came to be interpreted in Western terms such as "mysticism", resulting in comparisons with Western terms and practices.

Yoga is a term for physical, mental, and spiritual practices or disciplines which aim to attain a state of permanent peace. Various traditions of yoga are found in Hinduism, Buddhism and Jainism. The Yoga Sūtras of Patañjali define yoga as "the stilling of the changing states of the mind," culminating in the state of samadhi.

Classical Vedanta gives philosophical interpretations and commentaries of the Upanishads, a vast collection of ancient hymns. At least ten schools of Vedanta are known, of which Advaita Vedanta, Vishishtadvaita, and Dvaita are the best known. Advaita Vedanta, as expounded by Adi Shankara, states that there is no difference between Atman (the world-soul) and Brahman (the divine). The best-known subschool is Kevala Vedanta or mayavada as expounded by Adi Shankara. Advaita Vedanta has acquired a broad acceptance in Indian culture and beyond as the paradigmatic example of Hindu spirituality. In contrast Bhedabheda-Vedanta emphasizes that Atman and Brahman are both the same and not the same, while Dvaita Vedanta states that Atman and God are fundamentally different. In modern times, the Upanishads have been interpreted by Neo-Vedanta as being "mystical".

Various Shaivist, Shakta and Tantric traditions are strongly nondualistic, among them Kashmir Shaivism and Sri Vidya.

Tantra 

Tantra is the name given by scholars to a style of meditation and ritual which arose in India no later than the fifth century AD. Tantra has influenced the Hindu, Bön, Buddhist, and Jain traditions and spread with Buddhism to East and Southeast Asia. Tantric ritual seeks to access the supra-mundane through the mundane, identifying the microcosm with the macrocosm. The Tantric aim is to sublimate (rather than negate) reality. The Tantric practitioner seeks to use prana (energy flowing through the universe, including one's body) to attain goals which may be spiritual, material or both. Tantric practice includes visualisation of deities, mantras and mandalas. It can also include sexual and other (antinomian) practices.

Sant-tradition and Sikhism 

Mysticism in the Sikh dharm began with its founder, Guru Nanak, who as a child had profound mystical experiences. Guru Nanak stressed that God must be seen with 'the inward eye', or the 'heart', of a human being. Guru Arjan, the fifth Sikh Guru, added religious mystics belonging to other religions into the holy scriptures that would eventually become the Guru Granth Sahib.

The goal of Sikhism is to be one with God. Sikhs meditate as a means to progress towards enlightenment; it is devoted meditation simran that enables a sort of communication between the Infinite and finite human consciousness. There is no concentration on the breath but chiefly the remembrance of God through the recitation of the name of God and surrender themselves to God's presence often metaphorized as surrendering themselves to the Lord's feet.

Buddhism 

According to Paul Oliver, a lecturer at Huddersfield University, Buddhism is mystical in the sense that it aims at the identification of the true nature of our self, and live according to it. Buddhism originated in India, sometime between the 6th and 4th centuries BCE, but is now mostly practiced in other countries, where it developed into a number of traditions, the main ones being Therevada, Mahayana, and Vajrayana.

Buddhism aims at liberation from the cycle of rebirth by self-control through meditation and morally just behaviour. Some Buddhist paths aim at a gradual development and transformation of the personality toward Nirvana, like the Theravada stages of enlightenment. Others, like the Japanese Rinzai Zen tradition, emphasize sudden insight, but nevertheless also prescribe intensive training, including meditation and self-restraint.

Although Theravada does not acknowledge the existence of a theistic Absolute, it does postulate Nirvana as a transcendent reality which may be attained. It further stresses transformation of the personality through meditative practice, self-restraint, and morally just behaviour. According to Richard H. Jones, Theravada is a form of mindful extrovertive and introvertive mysticism, in which the conceptual structuring of experiences is weakened, and the ordinary sense of self is weakened. It is best known in the west from the Vipassana movement, a number of branches of modern Theravāda Buddhism from Burma, Cambodia, Laos, Thailand and Sri Lanka, and includes contemporary American Buddhist teachers such as Joseph Goldstein and Jack Kornfield.

The Yogacara school of Mahayana investigates the workings of the mind, stating that only the mind (citta-mātra) or the representations we cognize (vijñapti-mātra), really exist. In later Buddhist Mahayana thought, which took an idealistic turn, the unmodified mind came to be seen as a pure consciousness, from which everything arises. Vijñapti-mātra, coupled with Buddha-nature or tathagatagarba, has been an influential concept in the subsequent development of Mahayana Buddhism, not only in India, but also in China and Tibet, most notable in the Chán (Zen) and Dzogchen traditions.

Chinese and Japanese Zen is grounded on the Chinese understanding of the Buddha-nature as one true's essence, and the Two truths doctrine as a polarity between relative and Absolute reality. Zen aims at insight one's true nature, or Buddha-nature, thereby manifesting Absolute reality in the relative reality. In Soto, this Buddha-nature is regarded to be ever-present, and shikan-taza, sitting meditation, is the expression of the already existing Buddhahood. Rinzai-zen emphasises the need for a break-through insight in this Buddha-nature, but also stresses that further practice is needed to deepen the insight and to express it in daily life, as expressed in the Three mysterious Gates, the Four Ways of Knowing of Hakuin, and the Ten Ox-Herding Pictures. The Japanese Zen-scholar D.T. Suzuki noted similarities between Zen-Buddhism and Christian mysticism, especially meister Eckhart.

The Tibetan Vajrayana tradition is based on Madhyamaka philosophy and Tantra. In deity yoga, visualizations of deities are eventually dissolved, to realize the inherent emptiness of every-'thing' that exists. Dzogchen, which is being taught in both the Tibetan buddhist Nyingma school and the Bön tradition, focuses on direct insight into our real nature. It holds that "mind-nature" is manifested when one is enlightened, being nonconceptually aware (rigpa, "open presence") of one's nature, "a recognition of one's beginningless nature." Mahamudra has similarities with Dzogchen, emphasizing the meditational approach to insight and liberation.

Taoism 

Taoist philosophy is centered on the Tao, usually translated "Way", an ineffable cosmic principle. The contrasting yet interdependent concepts of yin and yang also symbolise harmony, with Taoist scriptures often emphasising the Yin virtues of femininity, passivity and yieldingness. Taoist practice includes exercises and rituals aimed at manipulating the life force Qi, and obtaining health and longevity. These have been elaborated into practices such as Tai chi, which are well known in the west.

Secularization of mysticism

Today there is also occurring in the West what Richard Jones calls "the secularization of mysticism". That is the separation of meditation and other mystical practices from their traditional use in religious ways of life to only secular ends of purported psychological and physiological benefits.

Scholarly approaches of mysticism and mystical experience

Types of mysticism 
R. C. Zaehner distinguishes three fundamental types of mysticism, namely theistic, monistic and panenhenic ("all-in-one") or natural mysticism. The theistic category includes most forms of Jewish, Christian and Islamic mysticism and occasional Hindu examples such as Ramanuja and the Bhagavad Gita. The monistic type, which according to Zaehner is based upon an experience of the unity of one's soul, includes Buddhism and Hindu schools such as Samkhya and Advaita vedanta. Nature mysticism seems to refer to examples that do not fit into one of these two categories.

Walter Terence Stace, in his book Mysticism and Philosophy (1960), distinguished two types of mystical experience, namely extrovertive and introvertive mysticism. Extrovertive mysticism is an experience of the unity of the external world, whereas introvertive mysticism is "an experience of unity devoid of perceptual objects; it is literally an experience of 'no-thing-ness'." The unity in extrovertive mysticism is with the totality of objects of perception. While perception stays continuous, “unity shines through the same world”; the unity in introvertive mysticism is with a pure consciousness, devoid of objects of perception, “pure unitary consciousness, wherein awareness of the world and of multiplicity is completely obliterated.” According to Stace such experiences are nonsensous and nonintellectual, under a total “suppression of the whole empirical content.”

Stace argues that doctrinal differences between religious traditions are inappropriate criteria when making cross-cultural comparisons of mystical experiences. Stace argues that mysticism is part of the process of perception, not interpretation, that is to say that the unity of mystical experiences is perceived, and only afterwards interpreted according to the perceiver's background. This may result in different accounts of the same phenomenon. While an atheist describes the unity as “freed from empirical filling”, a religious person might describe it as “God” or “the Divine”.

Mystical experiences 
Since the 19th century, "mystical experience" has evolved as a distinctive concept. It is closely related to "mysticism" but lays sole emphasis on the experiential aspect, be it spontaneous or induced by human behavior, whereas mysticism encompasses a broad range of practices aiming at a transformation of the person, not just inducing mystical experiences.

William James' The Varieties of Religious Experience is the classic study on religious or mystical experience, which influenced deeply both the academic and popular understanding of "religious experience". He popularized the use of the term "religious experience" in his "Varieties", and influenced the understanding of mysticism as a distinctive experience which supplies knowledge of the transcendental:

Yet, Gelman notes that so-called mystical experience is not a transitional event, as William James claimed, but an "abiding consciousness, accompanying a person throughout the day, or parts of it. For that reason, it might be better to speak of mystical consciousness, which can be either fleeting or abiding."

Most mystical traditions warn against an attachment to mystical experiences, and offer a "protective and hermeneutic framework" to accommodate these experiences. These same traditions offer the means to induce mystical experiences, which may have several origins:
 Spontaneous; either apparently without any cause, or by persistent existential concerns, or by neurophysiological origins;
 Religious practices, such as contemplation, meditation, and mantra-repetition;
 Entheogens (psychedelic drugs)
 Neurophysiological origins, such as temporal lobe epilepsy.

The theoretical study of mystical experience has shifted from an experiential, privatized and perennialist approach to a contextual and empirical approach. The experientalist approach sees mystical experience as a private expression of perennial truths, separate from its historical and cultural context. The contextual approach, which also includes constructionism and attribution theory, takes into account the historical and cultural context. Neurological research takes an empirical approach, relating mystical experiences to neurological processes.

Perennialism versus constructionism 
The term "mystical experience" evolved as a distinctive concept since the 19th century, laying sole emphasis on the experiential aspect, be it spontaneous or induced by human behavior. Perennialists regard those various experience traditions as pointing to one universal transcendental reality, for which those experiences offer the proof. In this approach, mystical experiences are privatised, separated from the context in which they emerge. Well-known representatives are William James, R.C. Zaehner, William Stace and Robert Forman. The perennial position is "largely dismissed by scholars", but "has lost none of its popularity."

In contrast, for the past decades most scholars have favored a constructionist approach, which states that mystical experiences are fully constructed by the ideas, symbols and practices that mystics are familiar with. Critics of the term "religious experience" note that the notion of "religious experience" or "mystical experience" as marking insight into religious truth is a modern development, and contemporary researchers of mysticism note that mystical experiences are shaped by the concepts "which the mystic brings to, and which shape, his experience". What is being experienced is being determined by the expectations and the conceptual background of the mystic.

Richard Jones draws a distinction between "anticonstructivism" and "perennialism": constructivism can be rejected with respect to a certain class of mystical experiences without ascribing to a perennialist philosophy on the relation of mystical doctrines. One can reject constructivism without claiming that mystical experiences reveal a cross-cultural "perennial truth". For example, a Christian can reject both constructivism and perennialism in arguing that there is a union with God free of cultural construction. Constructivism versus anticonstructivism is a matter of the nature of mystical experiences while perennialism is a matter of mystical traditions and the doctrines they espouse.

Contextualism and attribution theory 

The perennial position is now "largely dismissed by scholars", and the contextual approach has become the common approach. Contextualism takes into account the historical and cultural context of mystical experiences. The attribution approach views "mystical experience" as non-ordinary states of consciousness which are explained in a religious framework. According to Proudfoot, mystics unconsciously merely attribute a doctrinal content to ordinary experiences. That is, mystics project cognitive content onto otherwise ordinary experiences having a strong emotional impact. This approach has been further elaborated by Ann Taves, in her Religious Experience Reconsidered. She incorporates both neurological and cultural approaches in the study of mystical experience.

Neurological research 

Neurological research takes an empirical approach, relating mystical experiences to neurological processes. This leads to a central philosophical issue: does the identification of neural triggers or neural correlates of mystical experiences prove that mystical experiences are no more than brain events or does it merely identify the brain activity occurring during a genuine cognitive event? The most common positions are that neurology reduces mystical experiences or that neurology is neutral to the issue of mystical cognitivity.

Interest in mystical experiences and psychedelic drugs has also recently seen a resurgence.

The temporal lobe seems to be involved in mystical experiences, and in the change in personality that may result from such experiences. It generates the feeling of "I," and gives a feeling of familiarity or strangeness to the perceptions of the senses. There is a long-standing notion that epilepsy and religion are linked, and some religious figures may have had temporal lobe epilepsy (TLE).

The anterior insula may be involved in ineffability, a strong feeling of certainty which cannot be expressed in words, which is a common quality in mystical experiences. According to Picard, this feeling of certainty may be caused by a dysfunction of the anterior insula, a part of the brain which is involved in interoception, self-reflection, and in avoiding uncertainty about the internal representations of the world by "anticipation of resolution of uncertainty or risk".

Mysticism and morality 
A philosophical issue in the study of mysticism is the relation of mysticism to morality. Albert Schweitzer presented the classic account of mysticism and morality being incompatible. Arthur Danto also argued that morality is at least incompatible with Indian mystical beliefs. Walter Stace, on the other hand, argued not only are mysticism and morality compatible, but that mysticism is the source and justification of morality. Others studying multiple mystical traditions have concluded that the relation of mysticism and morality is not as simple as that.

Richard King also points to disjunction between "mystical experience" and social justice:

See also 

 Michael Eigen
 Henology
 List of Christian mystics
 List of female mystics
 List of Gnostic sects
 Ludus amoris
 Numinous
 Philosophy of the Unconscious by Eduard von Hartmann
 Soul flight
 Spirit

References

Notes

Citations

Sources

Published

Web

Further reading

Religious and spiritual traditions

Constructionism versus perennialism

Contextual approach

Philosophical issues

Mysticism and modernity

Classical

External links

Encyclopedias 
 Dan Merkur, Mysticism, Encyclopædia Britannica
 Jerome Gellmann, Mysticism, Stanford Encyclopedia of Philosophy
 James McClenon, Mysticism, Encyclopedia of Religion and Society
 Encyclopedia.com, Mysticism

 
Christian contemplation
Esotericism
New Age
Nondualism
Philosophy of mind
Philosophy of religion
Spirituality